Meggetland Sports Complex, owned by Edinburgh Leisure, is a Sports Pavilion used for a number of International fixtures across the five outdoor facilities they hold; 3G Pitch, Astroturf, Football Pitches, Rugby Pitches and Cricket Pitches. They regularly host matches for many clubs and groups, including Boroughmuir Rugby Club, Boroughmuir Hockey Club, Edinburgh Cala Hockey Club, Boroughmuir Thistle Football Club and Boroughmuir Cricket Club. In addition, the ground also hosted three Edinburgh Rugby matches during the 2013–14 Pro 12 season. They hosted Edinburgh against the Ospreys on 28 February, Cardiff Blues on 11 April and Munster on 3 May.

In January 2016, the Edinburgh Wolves (American Football) announced that due to the closure of Meadowbank Stadium for development, they would be moving to play their home games for the 2016 season at Meggetland.

East of Scotland Football League team Tynecastle F.C. moved to Meggetland from their previous Saughton Enclosure ground in 2018 and will share the main stadium grass pitch with Boroughmuir.

References

Rugby union stadiums in Scotland
Sports venues in Edinburgh
American football venues in Scotland
Football venues in Edinburgh
Tynecastle F.C.
American football venues in the United Kingdom